Artem Merkushov (born 7 June 1996) is a Ukrainian football midfielder who plays for Bukovyna Chernivtsi in the Ukrainian Second League.

Career
Merkushov is a product of the FC Mariupol and FC Shakhtar youth sportive schools.

In July 2017 he returned to the newly promoted Ukrainian Premier League club FC Mariupol.

References

External links
 
 

1996 births
Living people
Sportspeople from Mariupol
Ukrainian footballers
Association football midfielders
FC Mariupol players
PFC Sumy players
FC Shakhtar-3 Donetsk players
FC Polissya Zhytomyr players
FC Bukovyna Chernivtsi players